There are many Jewish cemeteries in the London area; some are included in the List of cemeteries in London. This list includes those cemeteries and also some just outside the Greater London boundary.  Jews are also buried at other, not specifically Jewish, cemeteries. Between 1832 and 1841 the "Magnificent Seven" private cemeteries were opened, primarily to relieve Central London's Anglican churchyards. Later, some of them also encompassed burials for people from other faiths; many Jews of international renown are buried at Highgate Cemetery. Brookwood Cemetery in Surrey, opened in 1852, designated approximately half of the original cemetery to non-Anglicans, including Jews.

United Synagogue cemeteries

Federation cemeteries

Union of Orthodox Hebrew Congregations cemeteries

Western Charitable Foundation cemeteries

West London Synagogue cemeteries

S&P Sephardi Community cemeteries

Other cemeteries

Former cemeteries

References

External links
 Jewish cemeteries in London on the IAJGS website

 
London
Judaism in London
Lists of cemeteries in the United Kingdom
London-related lists